Les Sœurs Elliot (The Elliot Sisters) is a Canadian television drama series, which aired on TVA in the 2007–08 season.

The series stars Sylvie Léonard, Isabel Richer and Julie Perreault as three sisters whose lives are thrown into turmoil when their father returns from Angola after disappearing thirty years earlier.

External links
  "'Quel beau casting' pour Les Soeurs Elliot, Le Journal de Montréal, April 19, 2007

Téléromans
TVA (Canadian TV network) original programming
2007 Canadian television series debuts
Television shows set in Quebec
2000s Canadian drama television series